Thomas Taylor Bellhouse (25 December 1818 – 9 June 1886) was an English first-class cricketer.

Born at Manchester in December 1818, Bellhouse was by profession a solicitor. He played first-class cricket for Manchester, making five appearances between 1846–54. He scored 70 runs in his five matches, with a high score of 28. He died at Sale in June 1886. His brother, Richard, was also a first-class cricketer, while his sister, Margaret, married the cricketer Elgar Pagden; through this marriage he is a distant relation to the South African anti-apartheid activist Molly Blackburn.

References

External links

1818 births
1886 deaths
Cricketers from Manchester
English cricketers
Manchester Cricket Club cricketers
English solicitors
19th-century English lawyers